Heremia Te Wake (1838 – 29 November 1918) was a notable New Zealand tribal leader, farmer, assessor and catechist. Of Māori descent, he identified with the Te Rarawa iwi. He was born in Te Karaka, Northland, New Zealand. Celebrated land activist Whina Cooper was his daughter. She would help him in his work, as she would take a deep interest for such things.

He was deeply committed to the Catholic Church. He was a catechist who instructed the young and led services when clergy were absent. He died of influenza during the global 1918 flu pandemic.

References

1918 deaths
Te Rarawa people
New Zealand Māori religious leaders
People from the Hokianga
New Zealand Roman Catholics
Deaths from Spanish flu
1830s births